Jackson County (county code JA) is a county in the U.S. state of Kansas. As of the 2020 census, the county population was 13,232. Its county seat and most populous city is Holton. The county, first named Calhoun County for pro-slavery South Carolina Senator John C. Calhoun, was renamed in 1859 for President Andrew Jackson.  The Prairie Band Potawatomi Indian Reservation, near the center of the county, comprises about 18.5% of the county's area.

History

Early history

For many millennia, the Great Plains of North America was inhabited by nomadic Native Americans. From the 16th century to 18th century, the Kingdom of France claimed ownership of large parts of North America. In 1762, after the French and Indian War, France secretly ceded New France to Spain, per the Treaty of Fontainebleau.

19th century
In 1803, most of the land for modern day Kansas was acquired by the United States from France as part of the  Louisiana Purchase for 2.83 cents per acre.

In 1854, the Kansas Territory was organized, then in 1861 Kansas became the 34th U.S. state. In 1859, Jackson County was established.

Geography

Adjacent counties
 Brown County (northeast)
 Atchison County (east)
 Jefferson County (southeast)
 Shawnee County (south)
 Pottawatomie County (west)
 Nemaha County (northwest)

Demographics

Jackson County is included in the Topeka Metropolitan Statistical Area.

As of the 2000 census, there were 12,657 people, 4,727 households, and 3,507 families residing in the county. The population density was 19 people per square mile (7/km2). There were 5,094 housing units at an average density of 8 per square mile (3/km2). The county's racial makeup was 90.21% White, 6.84% Native American, 0.53% Black or African American, 0.17% Asian, 0.02% Pacific Islander, 0.39% from other races, and 1.84% from two or more races. Hispanic or Latino of any race were 1.49% of the population.

There were 4,727 households, of which 35.20% had children under the age of 18 living with them, 62.30% were married couples living together, 8.20% had a female householder with no husband present, and 25.80% were non-families. 22.70% of all households were made up of individuals, and 11.50% had someone living alone who was 65 years of age or older. The average household size was 2.63 and the average family size was 3.09.

28.30% of the county's residents were under the age of 18, 6.80% were from 18 to 24, 26.70% were from 25 to 44, 23.40% were from 45 to 64, and 14.90% were 65 years of age or older. The median age was 37 years. For every 100 females, there were 96.80 males. For every 100 females age 18 and over, there were 93.80 males.

The county's median household income was $40,451, and the median family income was $46,520. Males had a median income of $32,195 versus $22,305 for females. The county's per capita income was $18,606. About 6.40% of families and 8.80% of the population were below the poverty line, including 12.50% of those under age 18 and 9.20% of those age 65 or over.

Government

Presidential elections
Jackson County has supported the Republican Party candidate in every presidential election from 1936 onward. Democratic Party candidates for president have only won the county twice since 1880, in 1912 & 1932.

Laws
Following an amendment to the Kansas Constitution in 1986, the county remained a prohibition, or "dry", county until 2004, when voters approved the sale of alcoholic liquor by the individual drink with a 30% food sales requirement. The food sales requirement was removed in 2020.

The county voted "No" on the 2022 Kansas Value Them Both Amendment, an anti-abortion ballot measure, by 52% to 48% despite backing Donald Trump with 69% of the vote to Joe Biden's 29% in the 2020 presidential election.

Education

Unified school districts
 North Jackson USD 335
 Holton USD 336
 Royal Valley USD 337

Communities

Cities

 Circleville
 Delia
 Denison
 Holton (county seat) 
 Hoyt
 Mayetta
 Netawaka
 Soldier
 Whiting

Unincorporated communities
 Birmingham
 Larkinburg

Townships
Jackson County is divided into fifteen townships. The city of Holton is considered governmentally independent and is excluded from the census figures for the townships. In the following table, the population center is the largest city (or cities) included in that township's population total, if it is of a significant size.

See also
 National Register of Historic Places listings in Jackson County, Kansas

References

Further reading

 Standard Atlas of Jackson County, Kansas; Geo. A. Ogle & Co; 66 pages; 1921.
 Plat Book of Jackson County, Kansas; North West Publishing Co; 39 pages; 1903.

External links

County
 
 Jackson County - Directory of Public Officials
Maps
 Jackson County Maps: Current, Historic, KDOT
 Kansas Highway Maps: Current, Historic, KDOT
 Kansas Railroad Maps: Current, 1996, 1915, KDOT and Kansas Historical Society

 
Kansas counties
1859 establishments in Kansas Territory
Topeka metropolitan area, Kansas